Roarities is an extended play by Welsh alternative rock band the Joy Formidable. It was released on 5 July 2011 as a digital download and CD, the latter distributed exclusively through the band's website. The EP's title is a play on the title of their debut album, The Big Roar, and is composed of remixes and live performances.

Track listing

References 

2011 EPs
Atlantic Records albums
The Joy Formidable albums